Peng Xiaomin (born April 8, 1973) is a Chinese chess grandmaster. In 1997, he became China's 6th Grandmaster. Peng Xiaomin is married to WGM Qin Kanying.

Career
Peng has been a grandmaster since 1997. In 1998, he became the Chinese National Chess Champion.

He played for the China national Olympiad team for 1994-2000.

Peng competed in the FIDE World Chess Championship in 2000 in New Delhi, where he reached the third round having been beaten by Peter Svidler 2.5-1.5.

Peng was a World Top 100 Chess Player according to the FIDE ratings from July 2000 to October 2002, while also at the same time was the third ranked Chinese player.

Although today he is still officially in the Top 10 in China, he has limited his activities to playing for and coaching his club team in the domestic Chinese chess league.

Recently, he has moved to Canada with his wife and son. He is teaching Kelly Wang, Qiuyu Huang, Robert Liu, Zhong Wen Xuan, and other young Canadians.

China Chess League
Peng Xiaomin plays for Hebei chess club in the China Chess League (CCL).

See also
Chess in China

References

External links

1973 births
Living people
Chess grandmasters
Chess Olympiad competitors
Chess players from Hebei
Sportspeople from Handan